Borj-e Abbasabad (also Romanized as Borj-e ‘Abbāsābād; also known as ‘Abbāsābād and ‘Abbāsābād-e Borjak) is a village in Kuhestan Rural District, Jazmurian District, Rudbar-e Jonubi County, Kerman Province, Iran. At the 2006 census, its population was 113, in 24 families.

References 

Populated places in Rudbar-e Jonubi County